Transport in Georgia may refer to:

Transport in Georgia (country)
Transportation in Georgia (U.S. state)